Alessandro Raimo (born 8 March 1999) is an Italian professional footballer who plays as a right back for  club Siena.

Club career
Born in Piombino, Raimo started his footballer career in Fiorentina youth sector.

He joined to Livorno U-19 in 2016. On 24 August 2017, he was loaned to Serie D club Massese. He was loaned again the next season, on 17 July 2019 to Pontedera.

On 3 December 2019, he signed with Grosseto.

On 26 August 2022, Raimo joined Siena on a multi-year contract.

References

External links
 
 

1999 births
Living people
People from Piombino
Sportspeople from the Province of Livorno
Footballers from Tuscany
Italian footballers
Association football fullbacks
Serie C players
Serie D players
U.S. Livorno 1915 players
U.S. Massese 1919 players
U.S. Città di Pontedera players
F.C. Ponsacco 1920 S.S.D. players
U.S. Grosseto 1912 players
A.C.N. Siena 1904 players